Hydeville is an unincorporated village in the southwest part of the town of Castleton, Rutland County, Vermont, United States. Hydeville has a post office with ZIP code 05750. As of the 2020 United States census, Hydeville is included in the Castleton Four Corners census-designated place for population statistics purposes.

References

Unincorporated communities in Rutland County, Vermont
Unincorporated communities in Vermont